Beacon Power is an American limited liability company and wholly owned subsidiary of RGA Investments LLC specializing in flywheel-based energy storage headquartered in Tyngsboro, Massachusetts.  Beacon designs and develops products aimed at utility frequency regulation for power grid operations.

The storage systems are designed to help utilities match supply with varying demand by storing excess power in arrays of  flywheels at off-peak times for use during peak demand.

History
Beacon Power was founded in Woburn, Massachusetts in 1997 as a subsidiary of SatCon Technology Corporation, a maker of alternative energy management systems. The company went public in 2000.

In June 2008, Beacon Power opened new headquarters in Tyngsboro, with financing from Massachusetts state agencies. The new facility is intended to support an expansion of the company's operation.

In 2009 Beacon received a loan guarantee from the United States Department of Energy (DOE) for $43 million to build a 20-megawatt flywheel power plant in Stephentown, New York.

On 30 October 2011, the company filed for Chapter 11 bankruptcy protection under in the United States bankruptcy court in Delaware. As part of the bankruptcy court proceedings, Beacon Power agreed on November 18 to sell its Stephentown facility to repay the DOE loan.

As of 6 February 2012, Rockland Capital, a private equity firm, bought the plant and most of the company's other assets for $30.5 million. Rockland Capital intends to rehire most of staff and to provide the capital to build a second 20MW plant in Pennsylvania.

On May 1, 2018, investment arm of RGA Labs acquired the company.

The physical assets, the 20 MW NY Facility named Stephentown Spindle and the 20 MW facility Hazle Township PA were sold to Convergent Energy and Power

See also

 Distributed generation
 Flywheel energy storage
 List of energy storage projects

Notes and references

Further reading 

 Corum, Lyn. The New Core Technology: Energy storage is part of the smart grid evolution, The Journal of Energy Efficiency and Reliability, December 31, 2009.  Discusses: Anaheim Public Utilities Department, lithium ion energy storage, iCel Systems, Beacon Power, Electric Power Research Institute (EPRI), ICEL, Self Generation Incentive Program, ICE Energy, vanadium redox flow, lithium Ion, regenerative fuel cell, ZBB, VRB, lead acid, CAES, and Thermal Energy Storage.
 Ricketts, Camille.  DOE Charges Up Flywheels, Finalizes $43M Loan to Beacon Power, VentureBeat, The New York Times, August 10, 2010. Discusses Beacon Power and flywheel energy storage.

External links 
 
 Reports and White Papers on  flywheel-based energy storage systems, Beacon Power
 June  2008 newspaper article

Energy companies of the United States
Grid energy storage
Manufacturing companies based in Massachusetts
Companies based in Middlesex County, Massachusetts
Energy companies established in 1997
Companies formerly listed on the Nasdaq
Companies that filed for Chapter 11 bankruptcy in 2011